Richard Allen Hunt (16 June 1937 – 22 March
2009) was an American mathematician. He graduated from Washington University in St. Louis in 1965 with a dissertation entitled Operators acting on Lorentz Spaces.  An important result of  states that the Fourier expansion of a function in Lp, 
p > 1, converges almost everywhere.  The case p=2 is due to Lennart Carleson, and for this reason the general result is called the Carleson-Hunt theorem.  Hunt was the 1969 recipient of the Salem Prize. He was a faculty member at Purdue University from 1969 to 2000, when he retired as professor emeritus.

See also 
 Convergence of Fourier series

References

 

20th-century American mathematicians
21st-century American mathematicians
Washington University in St. Louis alumni
Washington University in St. Louis mathematicians
Purdue University faculty
1937 births
2009 deaths